Percilia is a genus of perch-like fish in the monogeneric family Perciliidae.

Species
The genus Percilia currently contains these two species which are endemic to Chile:

 Percilia gillissi Girard, 1855
 Percilia irwini Eigenmann, 1928

References

 
Taxonomy articles created by Polbot
Endemic fauna of Chile